I'm Sorry, known in Japan as , is a political satire arcade game developed by Coreland and published by Sega in 1985. This action game stars a caricature of former Prime Minister of Japan Kakuei Tanaka. The title is actually a play on the Japanese word for Prime Minister, Sōri (総理). I'm Sorry was made after the Lockheed bribery scandals, and satirizes Tanaka's greed by making the goal of the game acquiring gold bars. Despite the game's context in Japanese politics, I'm Sorry was localized to United States arcades.

Gameplay
The goal is for the greedy protagonist to collect all the gold bars while jumping over or defeating various enemies and obstacles in each maze-like level. Some of these enemies are: Giant Baba (a Japanese wrestler), a moonwalking Michael Jackson, Madonna, Japanese comedian Tamori, Carl Lewis, moving statues (activated when passed by). Some obstacles include: Gates, "fire" hydrants, safes (making it difficult to gain access to the gold), a rolling barrel, conveyor belts, and a swimming pool with platforms ranging in size and strength. When you collect all the gold in a given level, you must cash it into a building (labeled "out" when the level begins and "in" once you retrieve all the gold) to beat the level. The player can only hold ten bars of gold at once. In later levels there are more than 10 bars of gold, so the player must make multiple deposits.

Levels
The game has 4 maps. After every 4 levels the game returns to first map. However, the difficulty of the map is increased by adding one of the following:
 More enemies
 More difficult enemies
 Conveyor belts
 Gates
 Disappearing platforms
 More gold
 Safes
There are 32 distinct levels. Once level 32 is completed, the player returns to level 16.

Reception 
In Japan, Game Machine listed I'm Sorry on their May 15, 1985 issue as being the  most-successful table arcade unit of the month.

References

External links
 I'm Sorry at Arcade-History.com

1985 video games
Arcade video games
Arcade-only video games
Sega System 1 games
Maze games
Parody video games
Political satire video games
Sega beat 'em ups
Sega arcade games
Video games developed in Japan
Banpresto games